Rajae Rochdy-Abbas (born 8 August 1983) is a Moroccan female badminton player. She trained at the Athlétic Club Boulogne Billancourt in France.

Achievements

BWF International Challenge/Series
Women's Singles

Women's Doubles

Mixed Doubles

 BWF International Challenge tournament
 BWF International Series tournament
 BWF Future Series tournament

References

External links 
 

Living people
1983 births
Moroccan female badminton players